Speedy in Oz (1934) is the twenty-eighth in the series of Oz books created by L. Frank Baum and his successors, and the fourteenth written by Ruth Plumly Thompson. It was Illustrated by John R. Neill.

This book features yet another island which floats in the sky: Umbrella Island, which flies by virtue of a huge umbrella with lifting and shielding powers.  The king is not very good at steering the flying island; he bumps it into a giant's head. For compensation, Loxo, the great brute, demands the King's daughter Gureeda, whom he mistakes for a boy, as a servant to lace his huge boots.  However, he grants the Umbrella Islanders three months to train the child to be a bootlacer.

Meanwhile, the boy Speedy (from The Yellow Knight of Oz) returns for another adventure. While inspecting a dinosaur skeleton, Speedy is blown by a geyser into the air. The skeleton comes magically to life and becomes Terrybubble, a live dinosaur skeleton. Terrybubble and Speedy land on Umbrella Island.  Speedy develops a friendship with Princess Gureeda.  He also becomes friendly with the island's resident wizard, Waddy.  An unscrupulous minister, however, notices that Speedy and Gureeda look very much alike and could pass for fraternal twins.  He hatches a plot to compensate the giant by handing Speedy over to him as a slave instead of Gureeda.  Terrybubble learns of this plot, and he parachutes off the island with Speedy and Gureeda.  All three are captured by Loxo, and it is up to the wizard Waddy to save them.

Aside from a brief consultation with Princess Ozma and her advisers, the book deals exclusively with characters of Thompson's creation.

Copyright status
Under current United States copyright laws, Speedy in Oz is scheduled to enter the public domain on January 1, 2030. All of Thompson's subsequent Oz books for Reilly had their copyrights expire prematurely, thus this will be the last copyright in the series to lapse.

References

External links
 On Speedy in Oz

Oz (franchise) books
1934 American novels
1934 fantasy novels
1934 children's books
Fiction about dinosaurs
Children's novels about dinosaurs